BU Canis Minoris is a quadruple star system in the equatorial constellation of Canis Minor. It has the Henry Draper Catalogue designation of HD 65241, while BU Canis Minoris is its variable star designation. The system is a challenge to view with the naked eye, having a peak apparent visual magnitude of 6.42. It is located at a distance of approximately 700 light years from the Sun based on parallax, and is drifting further away with a radial velocity of about +34 km/s.

In 2021, BU Canis Majoris was found to be composed to two eclipsing binaries, totalling four stars. Both pairs are double-lined spectroscopic binary systems that form Algol-like eclipsing binaries. The orbits of both systems are somewhat eccentric. The brightness of the system decreases from 6.44 down to 6.53 during the primary eclipse. It has a stellar classification of A0V, which matches an A-type main-sequence star that is generating energy through hydrogen fusion at its core. In reality, however, all four stars are nearly equal in properties, and have masses from 3.1 to 3.4 solar masses. The system is about 200 million years old.

References

A-type main-sequence stars
Algol variables
Spectroscopic binaries

Canis Minor
Durchmusterung objects
065241
038945
3103
Canis Minoris, BU
4